11 Squadron or 11th Squadron may refer to:

Aviation squadrons
 No. 11 Squadron RAAF, a unit of the Royal Australian Air Force 
 No. 11 Squadron RAF, a unit of the United Kingdom Royal Air Force
 No. 11 Squadron PAF, also known as the Arrows, a unit of Pakistan Air Force.
 11th Bomb Squadron (United States), a unit of the United States Air Force
 11th Reconnaissance Squadron (United States), a unit of the United States Air Force
 11th Operational Weather Squadron (United States), a unit of the United States Air Force
 11th Troop Carrier Squadron, a unit of the United States Air Force
 Strike Fighter Squadron 11, a unit of the United States Navy
 Marine Aviation Logistics Squadron 11, a unit of the United States Marine Corps
 11 Squadron (Belgian Air Force), a unit of the Belgian Air Component

Naval squadrons
 Submarine Squadron 11, a formation of the United States Navy

See also
 11th Army (disambiguation)
 XI Corps (disambiguation)
 11th Division (disambiguation)
 11th Group (disambiguation)
 11th Brigade (disambiguation)
 11th Regiment (disambiguation)
 11th Battalion (disambiguation)